Johnny Nugent (born July 18, 1939) is a Republican member of the Indiana Senate, representing the 43rd District from 1978 to 2014. He was born in Cleves, Ohio and graduated from high school in 1957. Nugent has owned Nugent Tractor Sales since 1968. He served on the Dearborn County Board of Commissioners from 1966 to 1974.

In 2002, he was arrested for driving under the influence, with a Blood Alcohol Content of 0.13%.

In 2009, he introduced legislation that would have prohibited Indiana schools from banning firearms.

References

External links
 Johnny Nugent at Ballotpedia 
Virtual Office of Senator Johnny Nugent official Indiana State Legislature site
 

1949 births
Living people
Republican Party Indiana state senators
People from Cleves, Ohio